They Are All Dead is a 2014 drama film with supernatural elements directed and written by Beatriz Sanchís which stars Elena Anaya. It is an international co-production among companies from Spain, Germany and Mexico.

Plot 
Set in the 1990s, it refers back to the 1980s, when Lupe, the lead character, was a rock star. In present time, Lupe suffers from agoraphobia. She lives secluded, only in contact with her son Pancho (a boy scout who hates her) and her Mexican mother Paquita. The ghost of her brother Diego breaks into her life.

Cast

Production 
The film is a production by Avalon PC, Integral Film and Animal de Luz, with funding from Ibermedia and Eurimages. Shooting began on 11 February 2013. Shooting locations included Madrid.

Release 
The film was presented on 27 March 2014 at the 17th Málaga Film Festival. Distributed by Avalon, the film was theatrically released in Spain on 30 May 2014.

Reception 
Mirito Torreiro of Fotogramas gave the film 3 out of 5 stars, considering Elena Anaya (in a role tailor-made for her) to be the best about the film whereas he assessed that the writing needed more work.

Jordi Costa of El País wrote that "it is not a perfect film, but it is a risky debut feature with a strong identity".

Manuel Piñón of Cinemanía rated the film with 2½ out of 5 stars, considering that despite being an "original and bold" film, it is dragged by a forced homage to 'La movida', assessing that the film may have turned to be a "happy anomaly" if it employed less nostalgia and respect to the past.

Reviewing for Excélsior, Lucero Solórzano deemed the film to be a "a good debut by Beatriz Sanchís" and that, writing shortcomings notwithstanding, it works and is watchable.

Reviewing for The Hollywood Reporter, Jonathan Holland considered the film to be "a challengingly offbeat but persuasively imagined “what if” bid to talk about well-worn family themes in an adventurous new way".

Accolades 

|-
| align = "center" rowspan = "4" | 2014 || rowspan = "4" | 17th Málaga Film Festival || Silver Biznaga for Best Actress || Elena Anaya ||  || rowspan = "4" | 
|-
| colspan = "2" | Jury's Special Award || 
|-
| colspan = "2" | Young Jury's Special Award || 
|-
| Best Original Soundtrack || Akrobats || 
|-
| align = "center" rowspan = "5" | 2015 || 20th Forqué Awards || Best Actress || Elena Anaya ||  || 
|-
| 2nd Feroz Awards || Best Actress || Elena Anaya ||  || 
|-
| rowspan = "2" | 29th Goya Awards || Best New Director || Beatriz Sanchís ||  || rowspan = "2" | 
|-
| Best Actress || Elena Anaya || 
|-
| 24th Actors and Actresses Union Awards || Best Film Actress in a Leading Role || Elena Anaya ||  || 
|}

See also 
 List of Spanish films of 2014
 List of Mexican films of 2015
 List of German films of 2014

References 

2014 films
Agoraphobia in fiction
Spanish drama films
Mexican drama films
German drama films
2010s Spanish-language films
Films set in the 1990s
Films shot in Madrid
Avalon films
2010s German films
2010s Mexican films
2010s Spanish films